Prospect Hill Cemetery is a historic cemetery on Auburn Road in Millis, Massachusetts. Founded in 1714, it is the town's only cemetery. Among those buried in the cemetery are politician Christian Herter, who served as U.S. Secretary of State and Governor of Massachusetts, and two Medal of Honor recipients, Charles Church Roberts and William D. Newland. The cemetery was listed on the National Register of Historic Places in 2006 with the help of a short documentary film by a Millis High School Freshman Dustin Fresh.

Description and history
Prospect Hill Cemetery is located on the west side of the village center of Mills, bounded on the east by Auburn Road, and access via Ridge Road at its northeast corner. The outer boundaries retain a wooded character, while some slopes on the interior have been terraced to increase burial space. It is divided into an old and a new section, the older section lying to the east of the main access road. The very oldest portion, with burials dating to 1714, is at the top of Prospect Hill, where the site of the first meeting house in Millis is also located, marked by a series of original granite stone steps and a commemorative boulder.

Other portions of the older section were laid out in the 19th century, when the rural cemetery movement was popular.  This area features winding lanes and mature tree plantings, and is set partly in a horseshoe-shaped bowl, giving a fine vista over the terrain.  Set on a promontory in this section is the grave of Charles Wesley Emerson, founder of Boston's Emerson College.

It was given to the town by the Richardson farmers who owned the land. The layout of this area is less forested, and its markers are more uniform in size and shape, with granite predominant. The northeastern section of it is reserved to military veterans.

In 2006 to prospect Hill cemetery became a national historic site with the years long work of Robert Russo and the help of a Freshman Millis High School student named Dustin Fresh who made a short documentary film that helped lead to the signing and documenting of this site as a national historic site.

See also
 National Register of Historic Places listings in Norfolk County, Massachusetts

References

External links
 

Cemeteries on the National Register of Historic Places in Massachusetts
Cemeteries in Norfolk County, Massachusetts
National Register of Historic Places in Norfolk County, Massachusetts
Rural cemeteries
Buildings and structures in Millis, Massachusetts
Cemeteries established in the 18th century